Henry Deane ( – 1503) was Archbishop of Canterbury from 1501 until his death.

Early life and education
In 1457, Deane is recorded as a Canon of Llanthony by Gloucester, his first appearance in the records. In 1473 and again in 1488 he is recorded as having rented rooms from Exeter College, Oxford, from which it has been assumed that he was a student at the University.

Career

Legal career
Deane was admitted to the society of Lincoln's Inn in 1489, suggesting knowledge of common law. On 13 September 1494, as part of a campaign to staff the Irish judiciary with  Englishmen of proven loyalty to the Tudor dynasty, he was appointed Lord Chancellor of Ireland under Sir Edward Poynings, in which capacity he made the opening address at the Drogheda Parliament of December 1494. When Poynings was recalled in January 1496, Deane was appointed his successor as Deputy Governor, but sour relations with the local clergy led to his removal in August of the same year.

Bishopric
On 13 April 1494, he was appointed Bishop of Bangor (confirmed by the Pope in July 1495), where he engaged in rebuilding the fortunes of the diocese after the rebellion led by Owain Glyndŵr. On 7 December 1499, Henry VII appointed him to the much more significant bishopric of Salisbury, confirmed by the Pope on 8 January 1500.

Archbishropic
On 13 October 1500, after the death of the Chancellor, Archbishop John Morton, Deane was appointed Lord Keeper of the Great Seal, which held until 27 July 1502. Thomas Langton, Bishop of Winchester, was elected to succeed Morton at Canterbury, but following his death on 27 January 1501, Deane was, in turn, elected on 26 April 1501. He was the first monastic to be elevated to Canterbury for 135 years and the last.

As archbishop, his main contribution was the negotiation of the Treaty of Perpetual Peace (signed January 1502) between England and Scotland, which also arranged the marriage of Margaret Tudor, daughter of Henry VII, and James IV of Scotland. He also officiated at the wedding of Arthur, Prince of Wales and Catherine of Aragon, assisted by 19 bishops, on 14 November 1501.

Death
Deane died on 15 February 1503, and was buried at Canterbury on 24 February. Sir Reginald Bray was one of his executors. Elrington Ball described him as one of the greatest ecclesiastical statesmen of his age.

References

1440s births
1503 deaths
Alumni of Exeter College, Oxford
Archbishops of Canterbury
Bishops of Bangor
15th-century English Roman Catholic bishops
15th-century English Roman Catholic archbishops
Bishops of Salisbury
Lord chancellors of Ireland
Burials at Canterbury Cathedral
Chancellors of the Order of the Garter

Year of birth uncertain